Chengdu South or Chengdunan railway station is a railway station in Wuhou District, Chengdu, the capital of Sichuan province, China. Services from this station include Chengdu–Mianyang–Leshan intercity railway. It is served by the South Railway Station on Chengdu Metro Line 1, Line 7 and Line 18.

History

On 8 May 2011, with the opening of the high-speed Chengdu East railway station, Chengdu South closed for renovations. However, during the 2012 chunyun, to relieve passenger burden on the other stations in the city, trains temporarily served Chengdu South. On 20 December 2014, with the opening of the Chengdu–Mianyang–Leshan intercity railway, the station reopened.

Chengdu Metro

South Railway Station is a transfer station on Line 1, Line 7 and Line 18 of the Chengdu Metro. It serves the Chengdu South railway station.

Station layout

Gallery

References

External links

Chengdu Metro stations
Railway stations in Sichuan
Transport in Chengdu
Railway stations in China opened in 1970
Stations on the Chengdu–Kunming Railway
Stations on the Chengdu–Chongqing Intercity Railway
Stations on the Chengdu–Mianyang–Leshan intercity railway